"Dirty Second Hands" is a song from Switchfoot's sixth studio album Oh! Gravity.  This was the first song released from the album, made available for purchase online as a single.  Despite this, the song was never released to radio.

When the band first posted the song for streaming on their web site, it contained several differences from the album version.  The first verse was backed by an electric guitar section which on the album version does not appear until the second verse.  The chorus also did not have the brief electric guitar dropout between vocal lines. Unlike the album version, this version was significantly shorter because it did not contain the vocal portion of the bridge. A few days later this version of the song was replaced by the final album version.

"Dirty Second Hands" was produced & recorded at Bigfish Studio by John Fields. As per executive producer Steve Lillywhite's suggestion, the earliest rough mix from the day the song was tracked was used on the album.

Live
This song was introduced into the band's live show during the Fall 2006 leg of the Oh! Gravity. Tour prior to the album's release and quickly became a concert favorite. The concert version of the song features an extended instrumental coda which includes frontman Jon Foreman wildly beating a suspended cymbal and climaxes in a distorted guitar solo by Drew Shirley.  The light show for this guitar solo during the Appetite for Construction Tour incorporated large amounts of unsynchronized strobe lights, increasing the dramatic effect. The coda closes with an instrumental reprise of the chorus riff, at the end of which the band suddenly cuts off.

Structure
The song uses unusual time signatures, the intro being in 5/4 with the last bar in 3/4. The chorus is first in 3/4 for three bars and then a bar of 2/4 followed by two bars of 5/4, while the verse is in 5/4. The breakdown is in 4/4 on the drums.

Other appearances
The song also appears as a track from Dave Matthews Band's tour sampler, So Much to Save.
An early version is also found on their late 2010 EP Eastern Hymns for Western Shores.

References

External links
Song stories
Lyrics
Live Performance of the song

2006 singles
Switchfoot songs
Songs written by Jon Foreman
Song recordings produced by Steve Lillywhite
2006 songs